Giovanni Sfortunati (active in the 16th century) was an Italian mathematician.

Sfrtunati was born in Siena. His book Nuovo lume ("New light", 1544) was one of the main sources for the work General trattato de' numeri et misure by Niccolò Tartaglia.

Works

References 

 Tucci U., Manuali d’aritmetica e mentalità mercantile tra Medioevo e Rinascimento, ne Il tempo cit., p. 55

16th-century Italian mathematicians
16th-century deaths